The third season of Bungo Stray Dogs anime series is based on the manga with the same name by Kafka Asagiri and illustrated by Sango Harukawa. It is produced by Bones was directed by Takuya Igarashi and written by Yōji Enokido. The first three episodes are based on a light novel prequel that shows how Osamu Dazai met Chuya Nakahara while working for the Port Mafia. The following episodes follow the manga's storyline with the Detective Agency and the Port Mafia being manipulated by a group known as Rats in the House of the Dead.

The third season aired between 12 April 2019 and 28 June 2019. It was broadcast on Tokyo MX, TVA, KBS, SUN, BS11, and Wowow. Granrodeo performed the third seasons' opening theme "Setsuna no Ai," and Luck Life performed the third seasons' ending theme "Lily." For the final episode, Screen Mode provided their theme song "Wright Left".


Episode list

Home media releases

References

Bungo Stray Dogs episode lists
2019 Japanese television seasons